Jonathan Jáuregui (born 27 October 1986), full name Jonathan Emmanuel Jáuregui Hernández is a Mexican footballer who last played for Europa F.C. in the Gibraltar Premier Division. He mainly plays as a striker.

Career
He later signed for then Ascenso MX side Altamira F.C., playing 5 games.

At the start of 2013, he moved to Europe to play for Bosnian Lower-League side NK Jedinstvo Sveti Križ Začretje, where he played for over 2 years before signing for Gibraltar Premier Division club Europa F.C. in February 2015. However he left the club in under 6 months.

References 

1986 births
Living people
Association football forwards
Mexican footballers
Europa F.C. players